The Sé de Portalegre, also known as the Cathedral of Portalegre (Portuguese: Catedral de Portalegre) is a cathedral in Portalegre, Portugal. It is classified as a national monument. Construction started in 1556 and ended in the early 17th century.

References

17th-century Roman Catholic church buildings in Portugal
Buildings and structures in Portalegre District
Portalegre
National monuments in Portalegre District
Portalegre, Portugal
1556 establishments in Portugal